PKP may stand for:

Organizations 
 Partido Komunista ng Pilipinas-1930, original Filipino communist party
 Partido Komunista ng Pilipinas, underground Filipino Maoist party
 Phi Kappa Phi, oldest all-discipline honor society in the United States
 Phi Kappa Psi, American social fraternity
 Pi Kappa Phi, U.S. social fraternity
 Polish State Railways (Polish: Polskie Koleje Państwowe), railway operator
 Political Consultative Committee (Polish: Polityczny Komitet Porozumiewawczy), a World War II Polish political organization
 Polish Auxiliary Corps (Polish: Polski Korpus Posiłkowy), a 1916–1918 Polish military formation in the Austro-Hungarian Army
 Public Knowledge Project, non-profit research initiative

Objects 
 PKP "Pecheneg", Russian machine gun
 Purple-K, fire-extinguishing agent

Other 
 Pierre Karl Péladeau, former leader of the Parti Québécois and largest shareholder in Quebecor Inc.
 HTTP Public Key Pinning, security feature
Pyaar Ka Punchnama, a 2011 Indian film
 A seismic wave that passes through Earth's outer core
 2020 Malaysia movement control order (Malay: Perintah Kawalan Pergerakan 2020), a partial lockdown order
 Pembroke-King's Programme, study abroad programme in Pembroke College in the University of Cambridge